Equipo Profesional Orgullo Paisa is a Colombian cycling team established in 1993, supported by the Antioquia Department government.

Team roster

Major wins

2011
Stage 2a Vuelta a Colombia, Team time trial
Stage 8 Vuelta a Colombia, Óscar Sevilla
Stage 9 Vuelta a Colombia, Óscar Sevilla
Prologue & Stage 5 Tour of Utah, Sergio Henao
Stage 4 Tour of Utah, Janier Acevedo
2012
Overall Vuelta Mexico Telmex, Julián Rodas
Stage 2, Julián Rodas
Stages 4 & 7 (ITT), Alex Cano
2013
Stages 3, 8 & 14 Vuelta a Colombia, Rafael Infantino
Stage 5 Vuelta a Colombia, Rafael Montiel
Stage 7 Vuelta a Colombia, Mauricio Ortega
2014
 U23 National Time Trial Championships, Carlos Ramirez
Stage 11 Vuelta a Colombia, Jairo Salas
Overall Vuelta a Guatemala, Alex Cano
Stage 1b, Óscar Álvarez
Stages 3 & 4, Alex Cano
2015
 National Road Race Championships, Robinson Chalapud
Stage 1 Tour of the Gila, Rafael Montiel
2016
 National Time Trial Championships, Walter Vargas
Stage 9 Vuelta a Colombia, Jairo Salas
Stage 10 Vuelta a Colombia, Cristian Montoya Giraldo
2022
Stage 1 Vuelta al Táchira, Johan Colon
Stage 4 Vuelta al Táchira, Marco Tulio Suesca

National champions
2013
 Colombian U23 Time Trial, Carlos Ramirez 
2015
 Colombian Road Race, Robinson Chalapud
2016
 Colombian Time Trial, Walter Vargas

References

External links

UCI Continental Teams (America)
Cycling teams established in 1995
Cycling teams based in Colombia